Dale Rasmussen (born 5 July 1977) is a former Samoan international rugby union player. He played as an outside centre.
Rasmussen joined Warriors from Exeter Chiefs in the summer of 2004 and made his debut in the club’s first-ever Premiership match against Newcastle Falcons.

The Samoan international cemented his place in the side straight away and was a consistent player throughout the 2005/06 season, playing 23 league and cup games throughout the campaign. His performances and commitment was recognised by the Warriors coaching staff when they selected him as the Player of the Year, the award for which he picked up at the club’s end of season awards celebration.

Last season Rasmussen signed a new three-year deal, which will keep him at Sixways until 2010.

In 2012, Ramussen announced that he would leave Worcester Warriors and retire from Rugby.

External links
 Worcester Warriors Profile at Warriors.co.uk

1977 births
New Zealand rugby union players
New Zealand people of Dutch descent
New Zealand sportspeople of Samoan descent
Samoa international rugby union players
Worcester Warriors players
New Zealand expatriate rugby union players
Expatriate rugby union players in England
New Zealand expatriate sportspeople in England
Rugby union players from Auckland
Living people
Rugby union centres